Gymnopilus subpurpuratus is a species of mushroom in the family Hymenogastraceae. The type specimen was found in Jalisco, Mexico, growing on rotting pine wood in a garden. The fungus was described as new to science in 1991 by Gastón Guzmán and his daughter Laura Guzmán Dávalos.

Phylogeny
This species is in the aeruginosus-luteofolius infrageneric grouping in the genus Gymnopilus.

See also

List of Gymnopilus species

References

Fungi described in 1991
Fungi of Mexico
subpurpuratus
Fungi without expected TNC conservation status